Boyle County is a county located in the central part of Kentucky. As of the 2020 census, the population was 30,614. Its county seat is Danville. The county was formed in 1842 and named for John Boyle (1774–1835), a U.S. Representative, chief justice of the Kentucky Court of Appeals , and later federal judge for the District of Kentucky, and is part of the Danville, KY Micropolitan Statistical Area.

History
In 1820, a portion of Casey County, now south of KY Route 300, was annexed to Mercer County.  This became part of Boyle County when Boyle County was formed on February 15, 1842, from sections of Lincoln County and Mercer County.  It is named for John Boyle, Congressman, Chief Justice of the Kentucky Court of Appeals, and U.S. District Judge.

Associate Justice of the Supreme Court of the United States John Marshall Harlan, a supporter of civil rights and the sole dissenter in the Civil Rights Cases and Plessy v. Ferguson, was born in Boyle County in 1833.

A courthouse fire in 1860 resulted in the loss of some county records.

During the American Civil War, the Battle of Perryville took place here on October 8, 1862, fought between the Confederate Army of Mississippi and the Union Army of the Ohio. 7407 men fell in the battle.

Geography

Adjacent counties
 Mercer County  (north)
 Garrard County  (east)
 Lincoln County  (southeast)
 Casey County  (south)
 Marion County  (southwest)
 Washington County  (northwest)

Major highways

  U.S. Route 68
  U.S. Route 127
  U.S. Route 150
  Kentucky Route 33
  Kentucky Route 34
  Kentucky Route 37
  Kentucky Route 52
  Kentucky Route 300

Demographics

As of the census of 2000, there were 27,697 people, 10,574 households, and 7,348 families residing in the county. The racial makeup of the county was 87.77% White, 9.68% Black or African American, 0.19% Native American, 0.56% Asian, 0.03% Pacific Islander, 0.65% from other races, and 1.12% from two or more races. Hispanic or Latino of any race were 1.44% of the population.

There were 10,574 households, of which 31.00% had children under the age of 18 living with them, 53.70% were married couples living together, 12.50% had a female householder with no husband present, and 30.50% were non-families. 27.10% of all households were made up of individuals, and 12.10% had someone living alone who was 65 years of age or older.  The average household size was 2.38 and the average family size was 2.87.

By age, 22.70% of the population was under 18, 11.00% from 18 to 24, 28.60% from 25 to 44, 23.70% from 45 to 64, and 14.10% were 65 or older.  The median age was 37 years. For every 100 females, there were 98.30 males.  For every 100 females age 18 and over, there were 96.00 males.

The median income for a household in the county was US $35,241, and the median income for a family was $42,699. Males had a median income of $33,411 versus $23,635 for females. The per capita income for the county was $18,288.  About 9.10% of families and 11.90% of the population were below the poverty line, including 15.80% of those under age 18 and 12.10% of those age 65 or over.

Politics

Government

Education

Public schools
There are two school districts in the county.

Boyle County Schools is the school district that serves all of Boyle County except Danville with three elementary schools, one middle school, and one high school.
Danville Schools is the school district that serves the city of Danville with three elementary schools, one middle school, and one high school.

Kentucky School for the Deaf, a state-operated school, provides education to Kentucky's deaf and hard-of-hearing children from elementary through high school

Private schools
Two private schools operate in Boyle County:
Danville Christian Academy and
Danville Montessori School.

Colleges and universities
Centre College, a nationally recognized liberal arts college, is located in Danville. Four other colleges and universities have campuses in Boyle County:
 Bluegrass Community and Technical College,
 Eastern Kentucky University, closed as of May 2018.
 Midway University, and
 American National University.

Communities
 Aliceton
 Alum Springs (area between Parksville and Junction City)
 Atoka
 Brumfield
 Danville (county seat)
 Forkland
 Junction City
 Little Needmore
 Mitchellsburg
 Needmore
 Parksville
 Perryville
 Shelby City (annexed by Junction City)

See also

 Northpoint Training Center - a medium security Kentucky Department of Corrections facility located in Boyle County. 
 National Register of Historic Places listings in Boyle County, Kentucky

References

External links

 Boyle County, KY
 Danville/Boyle County Economic Development Partnership
 Danville-Boyle County Convention and Visitors Bureau
 Danville, Boyle County Chamber of Commerce

 
1842 establishments in Kentucky
Populated places established in 1842
Kentucky counties
Danville, Kentucky micropolitan area